Aleksandr Alekseevich Trofimov (born March 18, 1952, Moscow) is a Soviet and Russian actor of theater and cinema, Honored Artist of Russia (1992), People's Artist of Russia (2013), leading actor of the Moscow's Taganka Theatre.

Biography
Aleksandr Trofimov was born in a family that was in no way associated with the theater. Since 1969, he worked as a technician of the scene  of an officer club in the Malinovsky Military Armored Forces Academy. Since 1971, he became head of the youth studio at the national theater of the silk factory in Naro-Fominsk. In 1974, he graduated from the Boris Shchukin Theatre Institute and entered the troupe of the Taganka Theater. Trofimov chose this theater when he saw Vladimir Vysotsky in the play  A Good Man from Sezuan. On the stage of the Taganka Theater, the actor has been playing for many years and is engaged in a variety of performances. The most popular role being Yeshua in the production of Yuri Lyubimov Master and Margarita.

In his film career, the main director considers Mikhail Schweitzer, who starred in three films - Little Tragedies,  Dead Souls and Kreutzer Sonata.   However, the most popular role was played by the role of Cardinal Richelieu in the three-part musical film D'Artagnan and Three Musketeers,  although initially he had to play in this picture the episodic role of the English fanatic Felton.

Currently, Aleksandr Trofimov periodically invited to act in films for small roles, he is one of the leading actors of the Taganka Theater, he goes with the theater on tour outside the country. Since there are no serious film roles for the artist over the past few years, actor almost always refuses to interview, not including the need to tell only about the past works.

Selected filmography
 D'Artagnan and Three Musketeers (1978) as Cardinal Richelieu (voiced by Mikhail Kozakov)
 Little Tragedies (1979) as Walsingham
 Dead Souls (1984) as Nikolai Gogol
 Kreutzer Sonata (1987) as The Fellow Passenger
 Peter Pan (1987) as Captain Hook
 The Suicide (1990) as  Aristarkh Dominikovich

References

External links
 Александр Трофимов на сайте Театра на Таганке
 
  Евангелие от Трофимова

Living people
1952 births
Soviet male film actors
Soviet male television actors
Soviet male stage actors
Russian male film actors
Russian male television actors
Russian male stage actors
Male actors from Moscow
Honored Artists of the Russian Federation
People's Artists of Russia